Peter Gabriel: Eve, also known as simply Eve (stylized as EVE), is a music and art adventure video game directed by Michael Coulson and co-produced by the Starwave Corporation, developed and published by Real World Multimedia for Windows and Macintosh in 1996–1997. It was created in association with and featuring the music of Peter Gabriel.

Reception

The game received positive to average reviews. Entertainment Weekly called it "the first CD-ROM since Myst in which you can blissfully lose yourself for days, the world outside fading as your brain receives a lovely massage." Computer Games Strategy Plus said: "Because the game forces you to return to the same screens over and over again, Eve can get quite tedious at times, but somehow it manages to transcend its pretensions and become a true work of interactive art." However, GameSpot called it "a lavishly constructed audio-visual tour, but ... no more enriching than a day spent watching MTV." Erik Reppen of Game Informer said: "The bizarre and surrealistic scenes shocked my monkey, but it wasn't much of a game. I kind of prefer to solve puzzles through creative logic, not trial-and-error."

The game won the Milia d'Or Grand Prize award at Cannes in 1997.

References

External links
 

1996 video games
Adventure games
Art games
Macintosh games
Music video games
Peter Gabriel
Video games based on real people
Video games developed in the United Kingdom
Windows games